Dennis D. Berkey is a mathematician and college administrator who had served as the 15th president of Worcester Polytechnic Institute from 2004 until May, 2013. At WPI he oversaw the development of a biotechnology center known as Gateway Park in Worcester, Massachusetts. He also oversaw an expansion in enrollment, a new residence hall (East Hall), a new admissions building (The Bartlett Center), and a new sports and recreation facility.

Education
Berkey received a B.A. degree in mathematics from Muskingum College in 1969 and a M.A. degree from Miami University in 1971. He earned a Ph.D. in mathematics from University of Cincinnati in 1974 while working under the supervision of Alan C. Lazar.

Career
After receiving his doctorate, Berkey became a faculty member at Boston University in 1974. From 1978 to 1983, he chaired the mathematics department, and he served as dean of the College of Arts and Sciences from 1987 to 2002. He was the provost at BU from 1987 to 1991 and from 1996 to 2004.

References

External links

Muskingum University alumni
Miami University alumni
University of Cincinnati alumni
Presidents of Worcester Polytechnic Institute
Living people
1947 births